Gilbert Clotaire Rapaille, known as G. Clotaire Rapaille, is a French marketing consultant and the CEO and Founder of Archetype Discoveries Worldwide. Rapaille is also an author, who has  published on topics in psychology, marketing, sociology and cultural anthropology.

Early life and education
Rapaille was born in France and immigrated to the United States in the early 80s.

Rapaille attended The Paris Institute of Political Sciences for a degree in Political and Social Sciences and later went on to receive a PhD in Social Psychology from Paris-Sorbonne University.

Career
In addition to his books, he is known for advising politicians and advertisers on how to influence people's unconscious decision making. Rapaille's work identifies the unstated needs and wants of people in a certain culture or country as cultural archetypes.

Rapaille developed his theory on the brain after working as a psychologist for autistic children and studying Konrad Lorenz theory of Imprints and John Bowlby theory of attachment.  This work led him to believe that while children learn a given word and the idea connected with it, they associate it with certain emotions. He called that primal emotional association an imprint. This imprint determines our attitude towards a particular thing. These pooled individual imprints make up a collective cultural unconscious, which unconsciously pre-organize and influence the behavior of a culture.

Rapaille subscribes to the triune brain theory of Paul D. MacLean, which describes three distinct brains: the cortex, limbic, and reptilian. Beneath the cortex, the seat of logic and reason, is the limbic, which houses emotions. Camouflaged underneath those is Rapaille's theorized brain—the reptilian.

Rapaille believes that buying decisions are strongly influenced by the reptilian brain, which is made up of the brain stem and the cerebellum. Only accessible via the subconscious, the reptilian brain is the home of our intrinsic instincts. It programs us for two major things: survival and reproduction. Rapaille proposes that in a three-way battle between the cortical, the limbic (home of emotion) and the reptilian areas, the reptilian always wins, because survival comes first. This theory has become the basis for his thoughts on what a product means to consumers on the most fundamental level.

His theory that culture gets imprinted into the "Reptilian Brain" during early childhood has been heavily contradicted by scientific evidence. His practice of leading managers into regression sessions to tap into their unconscious in an attempt to discover a "code" word, has also been cited as "primitive" and has been heavily contradicted by scientific evidence.

In the opening of his book, 7 Secrets of Marketing, he says, "Cultures, like individuals, have an unconscious. This unconscious is active in each of us, making us do things we might not be aware of."  This collective cultural unconscious can be further defined as a pool of shared imprinting experiences that unconsciously pre-organize and influence the behavior of a culture.

Rapaille's claim of technique of "archetype discovery" stems from the psychoanalytic methods pioneered by the Viennese psychologist Ernest Dichter. This technique doesn't ask what people want, but why they want it.  These research methods focus on finding what he calls the “code”, the unconscious meaning people give to a particular product, service or relationship.  Rapaille posits that sublimated emotional memories occupy a place between each individual's unconscious (Freud) and the collective unconscious of the entire human race (Jung).

Rapaille Associates worked on Philip Morris's Archetype Project, an effort to study the emotional reasons why people smoke, presumably so the company could better leverage these emotions in advertising and promotions. Rapaille noted that typically peoples' first experience with smoking involved seeing an admired adult do it, and having a feeling that they were excluded from the activity and strongly wanting to be included. Rapaille ultimately linked smoking with adult initiation rituals, risk taking, bonding with peers and the need for kids to feel like they belong to a group and can partake in an "adult activity".  Rapaille's recommendations explain why PM supports—and advertises widely that it supports—restricting sales cigarette sales to minors and moving cigarettes out of reach of kids.

Rapaille appeared in a Frontline episode about marketing entitled "The Persuaders", which first aired on November 9, 2004 on PBS in the United States.

Controversy
Rapaille was hired in February 2010, at the approximate cost of $300,000, by Quebec City's mayor Régis Labeaume to analyze the city's image on an international level.
But an article published by Pierre-André Normandin in Le Soleil de Québec revealed that Rapaille's client list and CV contained several falsehoods and exaggerations. Following those revelations his contract with Quebec City was terminated. Although the mayor terminated his contract early on March 29, 2010, he was still paid almost the entire sum.

Rapaille said during his investigation that the city of Quebec has a masochistic side to it. He also claimed his mother listened to Félix Leclerc during WW2, before Felix Leclerc (a French-Canadian singer-songwriter and political activist) recorded his first album in 1951.

Published works
 "The Global Code: How a New Culture of Universal Values Is Reshaping Business and Marketing", 2015
 "Move UP", English edition, Penguin UK, 2015
 "El Verbo De Las Culturas" Taurus, 2015
 The Culture Code, Crown Publishing, 2007
 Seven Secrets of Marketing in a Multi*Cultural World First Edition. Executive Excellence, Utah 2001, in English; Second Edition. Tuxedo Productions, New York 2004 in English
 Social Cancer (the code for Terrorism) Tuxedo Productions, New York 2003, in English
 Versteh' Deine Eltern, Bucher, Munich 1984, in German
 Comprendre Ses Parents Et Ses Grands Parents Marabout, Paris 1982, in French
 Escuchelo: Es Su HijoPomaire, Colección Libre, Barcelona 1981, in Spanish
 Le Trouple Editions Menges, Paris 1980, in French
 Si Vous Ecoutiez Vos Enfants Editions Menges, Paris 1978, in French
 La Communication Créatrice Editions Dialogues, Paris 1976, in French
 Wisdom Of Madness Thomas Jefferson State College, Michigan State University, manuscript, 1975, in English
 La Relation Creatrice Editions Universitaires, Paris 1973, in French
 La Relazione Créatrice Cittadella Editrice, 1975, in Italian
 Laing Editions Universitaires, Paris 1972, in French
 Analyse des Pratiques Medicales et des Croyances Liées a la Maladie et aux Soins Dans Quinze Communautes Cicaraguayennes Thesis Paris, Sorbonne, 1969 (220 pages) in French

References

External links
 Interview for "The Persuaders", PBS Frontline, November 9, 2004
 Rebecca Leung, Cracking Your Wallet: A Psychologist Demonstrates a Feel for the Market, July 5, 2005, cbsnews.com
 ( Archetype Discoveries Worldwide )

French emigrants to the United States
Living people
1941 births
People from Orange County, New York
People from Palm Beach, Florida
People from Los Angeles County, California
Market researchers
Marketing speakers
People from Hobe Sound, Florida